Rüdiger (English Ruediger, Rudiger, Roger) is a German given name. The meaning comes from Old High German: hruod (fame) and ger (spear). The name became popular because of the character Rüdiger von Bechelaren from Nibelung.

People named Rüdiger 
 Aleksei Rüdiger (1929–2008), Patriarch Alexy II of the Russian Orthodox Church
 Antonio Rüdiger (b. 1993), German footballer
 Prince Rüdiger of Saxony (b. 1953), German prince
 Maria Rüdiger-Belyaeva, mother of John Shalikashvili
 Rüdiger Abramczik (b. 1956), German footballer
 Rüdiger Gamm (b. 1971), German "mental calculator"
 Rüdiger von der Goltz (1865-1945), German army general during the First World War, one of the principal commanders of Finnish Civil War, Latvian War of Independence, Battle of Cēsis (1919) and Estonian War of Independence
 Rüdiger Haas (b. 1969), German tennis player
 Rüdiger Heining (b. 1968), German agrarscientist and economist
 Rüdiger Huzmann (died 22 February 1090), Bishop of Speyer from 1075 to his death
 Rüdiger Nehberg (1935-2020), German human rights activist, author and survival expert
 Rüdiger Overmans, (born 1954), German historian specialized in World War II
 Rüdiger Safranski (b. 1945), German philosopher and author.
 Rüdiger Schleicher (1895-1945), German resistance fighter
 Ernst Rüdiger von Starhemberg (1638–1701), Austrian politician, military general and chief of Vienna, one of the principal commanders of Battle of Vienna
 Ernst Rüdiger Starhemberg (1899-1956), Austrian nationalist and politician who helped introduce austrofascism and install a clerico-fascist dictatorship in Austria, chancellor of Federal State of Austria
 Rüdiger Vogler (b. 1942), German film actor

See also
Rutger

References 

Germanic given names
German masculine given names